is a former volleyball player from Japan, who played as a center for the Men's National Team in the 1990s. Playing at the 1992 Summer Olympics in Barcelona, Spain (sixth place) he ended up in 10th place at the 1998 World Championship.

Honours

1992 Olympic Games — 6th place
1998 World Championship — 16th place

References
 Profile

1970 births
Living people
Japanese men's volleyball players
Volleyball players at the 1992 Summer Olympics
Olympic volleyball players of Japan
Asian Games medalists in volleyball
Volleyball players at the 1990 Asian Games
Volleyball players at the 1994 Asian Games
Medalists at the 1990 Asian Games
Medalists at the 1994 Asian Games
Asian Games gold medalists for Japan
Asian Games bronze medalists for Japan
20th-century Japanese people